Deborah Lee O'Dell (born October 5, 1973) is a Canadian actress and singer. She has appeared in various films and TV series.

Early life
Deborah O'Dell was born in St. John's, Newfoundland on October 5, 1973.

Career
Deborah made her acting debut in the 1997 fantasy film A Simple Wish, which featured Mara Wilson and Martin Short.

Deborah has made various television appearances including F/X: The Series, Earth: Final Conflict, and Mythic Warriors.

She voiced Ariel Flyer in the animated series, Rescue Heroes, taking over for Lisa Messinger, who previously voiced Ariel Flyer for the first season.

Filmography

Film

Television

References

External links
 

1973 births
Actresses from Newfoundland and Labrador
Canadian film actresses
Canadian television actresses
Canadian voice actresses
People from St. John's, Newfoundland and Labrador
Living people